Mario Tenorio (born 21 August 1957) is an Ecuadorian footballer. He played in 17 matches for the Ecuador national football team from 1979 to 1983. He was also part of Ecuador's squad for the 1979 Copa América tournament.

References

External links
 

1957 births
Living people
Ecuadorian footballers
Ecuador international footballers
Association football forwards
Sportspeople from Esmeraldas, Ecuador